Aleksandra Jarmolińska (born 6 September 1990) is a Polish sports shooter. She competed in the women's skeet event at the 2016 Summer Olympics. She came out as lesbian shortly before the 2020 Summer Olympic Games. She announced her plan to get married in Denmark after the Olympics.

References

External links
 

1990 births
Living people
Polish female sport shooters
Polish LGBT sportspeople
LGBT sport shooters
Olympic shooters of Poland
Shooters at the 2016 Summer Olympics
Sportspeople from Warsaw
European Games competitors for Poland
Shooters at the 2015 European Games
Shooters at the 2019 European Games
Shooters at the 2020 Summer Olympics
21st-century LGBT people
21st-century Polish women